Mellors is a surname. Notable people with the surname include:

Bob Mellors (born 1950), British gay rights activist
John Mellors (1947–2021), Australian public servant 
Mark Mellors (1880–1961), English footballer
Nathaniel Mellors (born 1974), British artist and musician
Ted Mellors (1907–1946), English international motorcycle road racer

Fictional characters
Oliver Mellors, a character in the novel Lady Chatterley's Lover

See also
Maelor
Meller (disambiguation)
Mellor (disambiguation)